Brachyta interrogationis is the species of the Lepturinae subfamily in long-horned beetle family. This species was described in 1758 by Carl Linnaeus in the 10th edition of Systema Naturae under the name Leptura interrogationis.

Subtaxa 
There is one varietet in species:
 Brachyta interrogationis var. biquadrisignata Pic
 Brachyta interrogationis var. ebenina Mulsant

Distribution
This species mainly occurs in Central Europe (Austria, Northern Czech Republic, Finland, France, Eastern Germany, Northern Italy, Norway, Southern Poland, Eastern Slovakia, Sweden and Switzerland), Caucasus, east to Western Russia, Kazakhstan, Siberia, Mongolia, Manchuria, Korea and Japan.

Habitat
In Europe, this species is boreal-mountainous, reaching south to the Italian and French Alps, and north to the Arctic Circle. In the Alps, these beetles can be found at elevations up to 2700 meters above sea level.

Description

They have a black body. Pronotum is convex, with dense punctuation. Also head, thorax and legs are black. Legs are relatively long and slender. The elytra are characterized by a very high variability and more than 150 varietas have been described. Sometimes the elitra are completely black or completely yellow, but usually they are brownish-yellow, with black spots on scutellum, two longitudinal black arcuate bands, and black spots on the sides and on the apex. Antennae are composed by 5-11 segments.

Biology
The adult beetles can be seen on flowers from around May to August. They mainly feed on leaves, petals and pollen of flowers of wood cranesbill, but also on wild angelica (Angelica sylvestris), Anemone, plumeless thistles (Carduus species), hogweed (Heracleum species), Bupleurum species, peony and spurge (Euphorbia species).

The larva develop in the soil, feeding on roots of grasses and other perennial plants. in which they dig longitudinal galleries. The development time from larva to imago takes one to two years. Then they form a pupation chamber, from which the imago leaves in May and June.

References

External links
 Bewetles (Coleoptera) and Coleopterologists

Lepturinae
Beetles described in 1758
Taxa named by Carl Linnaeus